Electric Feet is the sixth studio album by Norwegian singer-songwriter Bertine Zetlitz and was released on March 16, 2012. The first single, "Electric Feet" (feat. Samsaya), was released one month prior. "Starlight" was released as second single on November 2, 2012. Both singles were released digitally, but the Starlight EP is in contrast to the first single available outside Scandinavia.
The album entered the Norwegian album charts on no. 6.

Track listing

Chart positions

References

2012 albums
Bertine Zetlitz albums